In Greek mythology, Dryope (Ancient Greek: Δρυόπη derived from δρῦς drys, "oak"; dryope "woodpecker") is the name attributed to several distinct figures:

Dryope, daughter of Dryops and mother of Amphissus by Apollo.
 Dryope, mother of Tarquitus by Faunus, the god of the woods. Tarquitus was slain by Aeneas.
 Dryope, a nymph responsible for kidnapping Hylas, which she did in accord with Hera's will. Her name may have to do with the fact that Hylas was the son of Theiodamas, the king of the Dryopes.
 Dryope, a Theban woman of Phoenician origin, mother of Chromis. She joined the Maenads disregarding her pregnancy, and went into labor when she was dragging a sacrificial bull by the horns.
 Dryope, a Lemnian.
 Dryope, mother of the Oenotropae by Anius

See also
 Dryopia

Notes

References 
 Gaius Valerius Flaccus, Argonautica translated by Mozley, J H. Loeb Classical Library Volume 286. Cambridge, MA, Harvard University Press; London, William Heinemann Ltd. 1928. Online version at theio.com.
Gaius Valerius Flaccus, Argonauticon. Otto Kramer. Leipzig. Teubner. 1913. Latin text available at the Perseus Digital Library.
Graves, Robert, (1955) 1960. The Greek Myths. 21.j; 26.5; 56.2; 150.b, 1.
 
 Kerenyi, Karl. 1951. The Gods of the Greeks 141, 173.
 
Publius Papinius Statius, The Thebaid translated by John Henry Mozley. Loeb Classical Library Volumes. Cambridge, MA, Harvard University Press; London, William Heinemann Ltd. 1928. Online version at the Topos Text Project.
Publius Papinius Statius, The Thebaid. Vol I-II. John Henry Mozley. London: William Heinemann; New York: G.P. Putnam's Sons. 1928. Latin text available at the Perseus Digital Library.
Publius Vergilius Maro, Aeneid. Theodore C. Williams. trans. Boston. Houghton Mifflin Co. 1910. Online version at the Perseus Digital Library.
Publius Vergilius Maro, Bucolics, Aeneid, and Georgics. J. B. Greenough. Boston. Ginn & Co. 1900. Latin text available at the Perseus Digital Library.
 Smith, William; Dictionary of Greek and Roman Biography and Mythology, London (1873). "Dry'ope"
 Realencyclopädie der Classischen Altertumswissenschaft, Band V, Halbband 10, Donatio-Ephoroi (1905), s. 1746

Nymphs
Theban characters in Greek mythology
Deeds of Pan (god)